Wimperis, Simpson & Guthrie were a firm of British architects based at 61, South Molton Street, London, W1, most active in the 1920s and 1930s.  They were known for their design of buildings such as Fortnum and Mason on Piccadilly, the Cambridge Theatre, Marine Gate in Brighton and Winfield House.

History
The founding partners were Edmund Wimperis, William Begg Simpson and Leonard Rome Guthrie, who joined the Wimperis & Simpson partnership in 1925.

Projects
 1925	Fortnum & Mason, London
 1925	Dupplin Castle
 1925-6 Beaumont Hotel, Mayfair, London
 1926	Grosvenor House, Park Lane, London with consultant architect Edwin Landseer Lutyens
 1929	Cambridge Theatre, West End, London
 1932	Flats, Brook House site
 1935 	North Scottish Regional Broadcasting Station
 1936	63 Harley Street, London
 1936	Winfield House, London
 1939 	Marine Gate, Brighton

References

Bibliography

Architecture firms of England